Amphibulimidae is a taxonomic family of land snails, semi-slugs, terrestrial pulmonate gastropod molluscs in the superfamily Orthalicoidea.

Distribution 
Distribution of the family Amphibulimidae include northern part of South America (Colombia, Venezuela, Brazil, Ecuador), Central America and the West Indies (Guadeloupe, Dominica, Martinique).

Taxonomy

2005 taxonomy 

This taxon was placed as a subfamily Amphibuliminae within the family Orthalicidae according to the taxonomy of the Gastropoda (Bouchet & Rocroi, 2005). There was classified also semi-slug Peltella Gray, 1855 within Amphibuliminae and Peltellinae Gray, 1855 was considered as a synonym of Amphibuliminae.

2010 taxonomy 
Breure et al. (2010) elevated Amphibuliminae to Amphibulimidae.

2012 taxonomy 
Breure & Romero (2012) removed Peltella to subfamily Peltellinae within Bulimulidae.

Genera 
Genera within the family Amphibulimidae include:

 Amphibulima Lamarck, 1805 - type genus of the subfamily Amphibuliminae
 Dryptus Albers, 1860
 Gaeotis Shuttleworth, 1854
 Pellicula P. Fischer, 1856
 Plekocheilus Guilding, 1828

References

External links 

 Beaure A. S. H. & Schlögl J. (2010). "Additional notes on Orthalicidae from the Chimantá massif, Venezuelan Guayana, with descriptions of new species of Plekocheilus Guilding, 1828 (Mollusca: Gastropoda)". Zootaxa 2416: 51-60. abstract.